In quantum information and quantum computing, a cluster state is a type of highly entangled state of multiple qubits. Cluster states are generated in lattices of qubits with Ising type interactions. A cluster C is a connected subset of a d-dimensional lattice, and a cluster state is a pure state of the qubits located on C. They are different from other types of entangled states such as GHZ states or W states in that it is more difficult to eliminate quantum entanglement (via projective measurements) in the case  of cluster states. Another way of thinking of cluster states is as a particular instance of graph states, where the underlying graph is a connected subset of a d-dimensional lattice. Cluster states are especially useful in the context of the one-way quantum computer. For a comprehensible introduction to the topic see.

Formally, cluster states  are states which obey the set eigenvalue equations:

 

where  are the correlation operators

 

Examples with qubits 
We take  for all , which means the cluster state is the unique simultaneous eigenstate that has corresponding eigenvalue 1 under all correlation operators. In each example the set of correlation operators and the corresponding cluster state is listed.

 

This is an EPR-pair (up to local transformations).

 

  This is the GHZ-state (up to local transformations).

 

.
This is not a GHZ-state and can not be converted to a GHZ-state with local operations.

In all examples  is the identity operator, and tensor products are omitted. The states above can be obtained from the all zero state  by first applying a Hadamard gate to every qubit, and then a controlled-Z gate between all qubits that are adjacent to each other.

Experimental creation of cluster states 

Cluster states can be realized experimentally. One way to create a cluster state is by encoding logical qubits into the polarization of photons, one common encoding is the following:

This is not the only possible encoding, however it is one of the simplest: with this encoding entangled pairs can be created experimentally through spontaneous parametric down-conversion. The entangled pairs that can be generated this way have the form

equivalent to the logical state

for the two choices of the phase  the two Bell states  are obtained: these are themselves two examples of two-qubits cluster states. Through the use of linear optic devices as beam-splitters or wave-plates these Bell states can interact and form more complex cluster states. Cluster states have been created also in optical lattices of
cold atoms.

Entanglement criteria and Bell inequalities for cluster states 

After a cluster state was created in an experiment, it is important to verify that indeed, an entangled quantum state has been created and obtain the fidelity with respect to an ideal cluster state. There are efficient conditions to detect entanglement close to cluster states, that need only the minimal two local measurement settings. Similar conditions can also be used to estimate the fidelity with respect to an ideal cluster state. Bell inequalities have also been developed for cluster states.   All these entanglement conditions and Bell inequalities are based on the stabilizer formalism.

See also 
 Bell state
 Graph state
 Optical cluster state

References

Quantum information science